The ENX Association is an association of European vehicle manufacturers, suppliers and organisations.

History

The Association
The ENX Association, which was founded in 2000 is an association according to the French law of 1901. Its headquarters are in Boulogne-Billancourt (France) and Frankfurt am Main. The 15 members of the association, which are all also represented on the so-called ENX board, are Audi, BMW, Bosch, Continental, Daimler, DGA, Ford, Renault, Volkswagen, as well as the automotive associations ANFAC (Spain), GALIA (France), SMMT (UK), and VDA (Germany). The association can decide to accept additional members upon request; however, the association rules state that the total number of members is limited.

Fields of activity
The ENX Association is a non-profit organisation that acts as a legal and organisational roof for the ENX network standard. It provides the participating companies with a platform for the exchange of information and for the initiation of pre-competitive project cooperations in the field of information technology. The main drive behind the German and French industries creating the standard was to protect intellectual property while at the same time reducing costs and complexity concerning data exchange within the automotive industry.

One cited benefit of the creation of a "Trusted Community" for branches of industry is that, although companies protect their own infrastructures, problems occur in cases where encryption or authentication solutions are used across different companies and yet should be acknowledged as confidential. An impasse is often reached when both sides seek to implement their own mechanisms, if not before. This is demonstrated by the example of email encryption, with the clash of safety regulations in view of shared application use and thousands of unencrypted data connections. A shared, confidential infrastructure provides a remedy here. Ford cites the use of ENX to communicate with suppliers as an example of how considerable savings can be made through consolidation and standardisation.

The implementation of industrial requirements for IT security between companies represents a further sphere of activity. The following are described as subject areas here:

 Secure cloud computing (between companies)
 Protecting intellectual property during development cooperations (e.g. using Enterprise Rights Management, ERM)
The assessment of fulfilling the said requirements is standardised and executed by approved external service providers. The ENX Association approves them and develops and governs the TISAX standard for this purpose. The Trusted Information Security Assessment Exchange allows the producers to rely on information security implemented at their service provders an Suppliers in their ISM Systems. The TISAX has similar task to the ISO/IEC standard 27001, but is tailored to the needs of the automotive industry, issues no public certificates and distinguishes degrees of implementation.

The ENX Association is a member of the ERM.Open project by ProSTEP iViP e.V. and, was active in the forerunner project SP2 together with Adobe, BMW, FH Augsburg, Continental, Daimler Fraunhofer IGD, Microsoft, PROSTEP, Siemens PLM, TU Darmstadt, TAC, Volkswagen and ZF Friedrichshafen.

The SkIdentity project, which the ENX Association is involved with, was named as one of 12 winners of the BMWi technology competition "Secure cloud computing for medium-sized businesses and the public sector - Trusted Cloud" by the Federal Ministry of Economics and Technology (BMWi) on 1 March 2011 at the IT exhibition CeBIT in Hanover. The BMWi has set up the Trusted Cloud programme to promote "the development and testing of innovative, secure and legally compliant cloud solutions".

Presidents of the ENX Association
The presidents of the ENX Association are:

 Philippe Ludet (since July 2019)
 Clive Johnson (since April 2013)
 Prof. Dr. Armin Vornberger (October 2005 - April 2013)
 Hans-Joachim Heister, Ford-Werke GmbH (July 2001 - October 2005)
 Dr. Gunter Zimmermeyer, Verband der Automobilindustrie e.V. (July 2000 - July 2001)

ENX Association memberships
The ENX Association is a member of the following associations and organisations:

 Automotive Industry Action Group (AIAG), Southfield, Michigan
 Bundesverband Informationswirtschaft, Telekommunikation und neue Medien e.V. (BITKOM)
 ProSTEP iViP e.V.
 RIPE NCC
 In addition, there are two-way affiliations with ANFAC, GALIA, and SMMT

Use of the ENX network

Usage scenarios

The European automotive industry's communication network of the same name is based on the standards set by the ENX Association concerning security, availability and interoperability. The so-called industry network guarantees the secure exchange of development, production control and logistical data within the European automotive industry.

The automotive industry is shaped by strong international cooperation and the necessity for companies to coordinate closely linked processes, which require a precise alignment and seamless exchange of data between partners. This makes "integrated global network concepts" necessary. ENX is described as a platform, which creates the foundation for these types of cooperative production models.

Realignment began at the end of 2002. The aim was to bring the technical development in line with user requirements on a consistent basis, particularly for small and medium-sized business. The implementation took several years. In June 2004, French users complained about the lack of cost-effective entry-level solutions in the France Telecom portfolio.

In March 2011, over 1,500 companies within the automotive and other industries were using the network, which is available worldwide, in over 30 countries.

The network can be used for all IP-compatible protocols and applications. The bandwidth ranges from classic EDI data exchange, to access to databases and secure email exchange, to the carrying out of video conferences. The use of EDI transfer protocols, such as OFTP (Odette File Transfer Protocol), OFTP2 and AS2, is widespread in the ENX network. OFTP2, which was developed from 2004, allows for use via the public Internet.

According to the trade press, some vehicle manufacturers have been demanding the use of OFTP2 over the Internet since 2010. "Tens of thousands of suppliers" are affected. In this medium, which is accessible to everyone, substantially more security is required for the transfer of sensitive data; it is difficult to estimate the implementation costs.

Registration as a pre-requisite for use

You must register with the ENX Association in order to use the ENX network. Registration can either be completed directly with the ENX Association or via one of its representatives.

Representatives of the ENX Association

In some countries and industries, the ENX is represented by industrial associations and organisations (so-called ENX Business Centres). These organisations act as contact persons in the relevant local language, process registration applications and take responsibility for the initial authorisation of new users in their relevant area of representation.

The ENX Association has chosen this model of representation to allow industrial associations and similar organisations to manage user groups on an independent basis.

Operating the ENX network

Operating the network and the data links

Operation by certified service providers

The ENX network fulfills the quality and security requirements found in company-owned networks, while also being as open and flexible for participating vehicle manufacturers, suppliers, and their development partners as the public Internet. Data exchange between ENX users takes place via the network of the communication service provider, certified for this role by the ENX Association, using an encrypted Virtual Private Network (VPN).

The first certified communication service provider was the Deutsche Telekom subsidiary T-Systems. This was followed by Orange, Telefónica, Infonet and, in 2007, Verizon Business. In 2010, three additional companies successfully acquired ENX certification, namely ANXeBusiness, BCC and Türk Telekom. According to information from the ENX Association, Open Systems AG is an additional service provider currently going through the certification process.

The services provided by the certified service providers are interoperable, and are provided in a competitive environment.

Overview of the service providers certified in line with the ENX standard

Certification process

According to the ENX Association, certification is a two-stage process. The first stage, the so-called concept phase, sees the ENX Association testing to see whether the service provider's ENX operating model fulfills the technical ENX specifications. The second stage sees the service provider putting their operating model into practice. Besides inspecting the internal organisation, the IPSec interoperability is also tested in the so-called "ENX IPSecLab". In addition, the ENX encryption is implemented and the connection is made to providers already certified via private peering points, so-called "ENX Points of Interconnection". Once this has been completed, the implementation and adherence to the ENX specifications is tested in a pilot run. Suitable preparation by the service provider should allow the chargeable certification to be completed within approx. three to four months.

Central operational elements behind the scenes

Central services are provided on behalf of and under the control of the ENX Association. These services provide a simplified connection ("interconnectivity") between the individually certified service providers and the interoperability of the encrypted hardware used. They include the so-called Points of Interconnection ("ENX POIs"), the IPSec Interoperability Laboratory ("ENX IPSec Lab") and the Public Key Infrastructure ("ENX PKI") in the ENX Trust Centre.

The Points of Interconnection have a geographically redundant structure, are interconnected, and are operated in data processing centres in the following regions: Rhine-Main region, Germany; Isle-de-France, France and East coast of the United States.

These central operational elements are not visible to the individual users. The customer sources their own connection, including IP router, encryption hardware, key material, uninterrupted end-to-end encryption of each communication, and individual service level agreements, directly from the certified telecommunications service provider that they have chosen.

Global availability

JNX industry network and the ANXeBusiness in North America

The Japanese automotive industry has an industry network that is similar to the ENX in terms of technology and organisation, namely the Japanese Network Exchange (JNX). The network is controlled from the JNX Centre, which is tied to the Japanese automotive associations JAMA and JAPIA. JNX and ENX are not linked.

In contrast, there are considerable technical, organisational and commercial differences between the ENX standard and the American ANX, which was developed back in the 1990s.

Connection between Europe and North America

ENX as a mutual standard since 2010

On 26 April 2010, the ENX Association and ANX eBusiness announced that they were going to connect their networks to create a global standard in the automotive industry. The connection resulted in a transatlantic industry network with more than 1,500 connected companies. The network went live with the completion of the pilot stage on 26 May 2010.

According to concordant statements by the ENX Association and the ANX eBusiness Corp., only the ENX standard is used for transatlantic connections both in Europe and in North America. In their announcements, the ANX and ENX have described the interconnection as being free of charge for the individual users.

Differences between ENX and ANX

The network for North America, the so-called Automotive Network Exchange (ANX), is operated by the ANXeBusiness Corp. Although, like the ENX, it was originally initiated by the automotive industry and operated by a consortium; in contrast to the ENX, it was sold and, as a result, operated as a classic profit-making service company.

ANX is a physical network. Availability stands at the forefront. For the time being, ANX is based continuously on the operation of fixed connections with high uptime guarantees. With the additional product "TunnelZ", ANX also offers an optional VPN tunnel management, which is not used by all those manufacturers and suppliers connected to the network. In the classic ANX network, key management takes place using Pre-Shared Key (PSK), while the encryption strength is limited to DES.

ENX is set up as a managed security service, which continuously incorporates a standardised tunnel management, a trust centre based Public Key Infrastructure (PKI) and authentication and encryption mechanisms based on various networks (from private to public).

In fact, while the ANX network has one provider for its customers, namely the ANXeBusiness company itself, ENX services are provided by various companies that are in competition with one another.

In order to link the networks despite this, ANXeBusiness continues to operate its own network separately from and untouched by ENX, but provides every ANX user who wants the service with an active native ENX connection, including all required security and service features, via its own physical network. ANX has undergone certification and monitoring by the ENX Association for this purpose, and acts as an ENX certified service provider.

Summary

With the certification of ANXeBusiness as an ENX provider, ENX and ANX use the aforementioned organisational differences between a non-profit-making industrial consortium (ENX) on the one hand and a service provider (ANX) on the other to connect the two networks. This is not a case of mutual interoperability, as ANX has adopted the ENX standard. There are likely to be new market perspectives for ANX as a result of the potential access to all ENX users. At the same time, it can be assumed that the bridge to the ANX will make it easier for other ENX service providers in the USA and, as a result, will generate competition.

References

External links

Communication networks within the automotive industry (non-profit organisations)
 ENX Association: worldwide
 JNX Center: Japan

Information from service providers certified in line with ENX standards (commercial solutions)
 ANXeBusiness Corp. 
 BCC: ENX Connect
 KPN: ENX – Automotive Industry Services
 Open Systems: ENX Global Connect
 Numlog – Orange Business Services Expert Partner for ENX data links 
 ICDSC – Orange Business Services Expert Partner for ENX data links
 Türk Telekom: TT ENX
 T-Systems: Extranet Solution - Securely integrate partners and suppliers
 Verizon: Certification through ENX

ENX member organisations
 ANFAC
 GALIA
 SMMT
 VDA

Automotive industry in Europe
Motor trade associations
Organizations established in 2000
Pan-European trade and professional organizations
Transport organizations based in Europe
Trade associations based in France
Trade associations based in Germany
2000 establishments in France
Transport industry associations